The Montana Elevator Co., was founded in 1904 as a wheat farmer co-operatives for Montana with their first elevator in Lewistown, Montana built in 1904.

References

External links
Free Trademark Search - Ceretana Feed

Agricultural marketing cooperatives
Companies based in Montana
Former cooperatives of the United States
Agriculture in Montana
Wheat
American companies established in 1904
1904 establishments in Montana
Grain companies of the United States
Agricultural cooperatives in the United States